Singleton Post Office is a heritage-listed former post office at 25-27 George Street, Singleton, Singleton Council, New South Wales, Australia. It was added to the New South Wales State Heritage Register on 2 April 1999.

History 

The original building was designed by Colonial Architect James Barnet and built in 1878 by W. Dart. The lobby was closed in to provide a telephone exchange in 1899. Barnet's successor, Walter Liberty Vernon, designed additions  1900s, including the extension of the roof to cover an added verandah and alterations to the east and west corners. The upper level verandah was added in 1924.

The George Street post office closed in 1974 when the current John Street building opened. The Commonwealth Government sold the former post office  1986.

Description

The former Singleton Post Office is a large two-storey building in the Victorian Italianate style with an arched colonnade and upper storey verandah at street face. It features rendered brickwork, a hipped slate roof and stone detailing in the footing, keystones and sills.

Heritage listing 
Singleton Post Office was listed on the New South Wales State Heritage Register on 2 April 1999.

See also

References

Bibliography

Attribution 
 
 

New South Wales State Heritage Register
Singleton, New South Wales
Post office buildings in New South Wales
Articles incorporating text from the New South Wales State Heritage Register